Silverhawk Generating Station is a 585 MW gas-fired power station located in the Apex Industrial Park in North Las Vegas, Nevada.  Power is generated by a D-11 steam turbine powered by two 501FD2 combustion turbines. The Southern Nevada Water Authority is a 25% owner in the plant.

History
The facility began construction as a Pinnacle West power station.

Facility
Since it is located in a desert where water is limited, the plant uses a six-story-high dry cooling system.

Notes

Energy infrastructure completed in 2004
Buildings and structures in North Las Vegas, Nevada
Natural gas-fired power stations in Nevada